JY1-SAT is a cubesat that is Jordan's first satellite. It was launched aboard SpaceX's Falcon 9 from the Vandenberg Air Force Base in the United States on 3 December 2018. It is named in tribute of the late King Hussein who was an amateur ham radio operator; his callsign was "JY1". The project was built by Jordanian students from various universities, and was funded by Jordan's Crown Prince Foundation.

References

2018 in Jordan
Spacecraft launched in 2018
Satellites of Jordan
First artificial satellites of a country